The United Kingdom held a national preselection to choose the song that would go to the Eurovision Song Contest 1968.

Before Eurovision

Artist selection 
Cilla Black had been the BBC's first choice to sing the 1968 UK entry, but she had turned it down as she did not believe any nation was likely to win back-to-back contests. As in 1967 when the UK won with Sandie Shaw, a current pop singer, Cliff Richard, was chosen to sing the song.

A Song for Europe 1968
The show was held on 5 March 1968 and presented by Cilla Black as a special edition of her debut BBC1 TV series 'Cilla'. Unlike the last three UK selections, the songs were not presented at all before the final. Instead, for the first time, the songs were broadcast twice in the final, with the performances repeated immediately after Richard had sung them successively. Viewers cast votes by postcard via mail to choose the winner and 171,300 chose Congratulations, a catchy party song, with the runner up over 140,000 behind in the poll. The result was broadcast one week later on 12 March 1968. The votes presented below were only announced rounded up.

Chart success 
Richard released all six short listed songs on an Extended Play maxi single titled Congratulations: Cliff sings 6 Songs for Europe, with the winner and the runner up being released on a standard single that spent two weeks at No.1 in the UK singles chart. This was the first of only two tracks from the Eurovision Song Contest that topped the UK chart without winning the competition. Cliff recorded French, German, Italian and Spanish versions of the winning song, as well as a German version of Wonderful World, which was also recorded (in English) by Elvis Presley.

At Eurovision 
"Congratulations" won the national and went on to come a close second in the contest, losing only to Spain by one point.

As the contest was held in the UK, the BBC opted not to send a Television commentator, instead Katie Boyle introduced each act from the stage. However Pete Murray provided commentary for BBC Radio 1. The contest was also broadcast on British Forces Radio with commentary provided by Thurston Holland. Michael Aspel served as the spokesperson for the U.K jury.

Voting

Congratulations: 50 Years of the Eurovision Song Contest

In 2005, "Congratulations" was one of fourteen songs chosen by Eurovision fans and an EBU reference group to participate in the Congratulations anniversary competition. It was one of two British entries to appear in the main competition (along with "Save Your Kisses for Me"). The song was drawn to perform first, preceding "What's Another Year" by Johnny Logan.

At the end of the first round, "Congratulations" was not among the five songs proceeding to the final round. It was later revealed that "Congratulations" finished eighth with 105 points.

Voting

References

1968
Countries in the Eurovision Song Contest 1968
Eurovision
Eurovision